Thomas von Heesen (born 1 October 1961) is a former German football attacking midfielder, and a current coach.

Most of his professional career was spent, as a player, with Hamburger SV, with which he won several accolades, both domestic and continental, appearing in nearly 400 official games for the club.

Playing career
Born in Höxter, North Rhine-Westphalia, von Heesen made his professional – and Bundesliga – debuts in 1980–81 with Hamburger SV, then went on to feature prominently for the club in the following two seasons, as the club won in that timeframe two leagues and the 1982–83 European Cup (during that campaign, he netted twice in just five matches, and appeared 34 minutes in the 1–0 final win against Juventus).

Von Heesen remained with Hamburg until 1994, with exactly 99 first division goals scored. He then switched, at nearly 33, to Arminia Bielefeld, being very important in the club's return to the topflight. In the following campaign, although appearing very rarely, he found the net on 28 August 1996, in a 1–1 home draw against MSV Duisburg, for his 100th, retiring at season's end.

Coaching career

Subsequently, von Heesen took up coaching. Von Heesen became interim head coach of Arminia Bielefeld after Ernst Middendorp was sacked on 17 August 1998. He was head coach for the remainder of the season when Hermann Gerland took over. His final match as head coach was a 5–3 win against 1. FC Köln where they won the 2. Bundesliga championship. He finished his tenure with a record of 20 wins, seven draws, and six losses in 33 matches. He became head coach of 1. FC Saarbrücken on 29 November 2000. His first match was a 1–0 win against Stuttgarter Kickers. He was head coach of Saarbrücken until 17 September 2001 when he became the Sporting Director for Aminia Bielefeld. His final match as Saarbrücken's head coach was a 1–0 against MSV Duisburg. He was also be interim head coach of the club from 17 February 2004 when Benno Möhlmann left for Greuther Fürth to 1 March 2004 when Uwe Rapolder was appointed the new head coach and from 11 May 2005 when Rapolder was sacked to 11 February 2007 when he resigned. He finished his second tenure with one win and one draw in two matches and his third tenure with a record of 18 wins, 16 draws, and 26 losses in 60 matches.

Von Heesen was appointed as the head coach of 1. FC Nürnberg on 12 February 2008. He resigned on 28 August 2008. He finished his Nürnberg tenure with a record of four wins, eight draws, and eight losses.

Two and a half weeks later, von Heesen joined Apollon Limassol. His first match was a 2–1 win AEP Paphos on 15 September 2008. He helped the club to a fifth place in his debut season. After almost two years with the club, on 29 January 2010, he was fired. His final match was a 2–1 win against AEL Limassol.

On 29 November 2011, he was appointed as manager of the Austrian Bundesliga side Kapfenberger SV until the end of the 2011–12 season. His first match was a 0–0 draw against Rapid Wien. Von Heesen got a three-year contract extension despite Kapfenberg being relegated. On 10 November 2012, von Heesen was promoted to Sporting Director and Klaus Schmidt became the new head coach. His final match was a 4–2 loss to Lustenau.

Coaching record

Honours

Player
HSV
 European Cup: 1982–83
 Bundesliga: 1983–84
 DFB-Pokal: 1986–87

Manager
Arminia Bielefeld
 2. Bundesliga: 1998–99

References

External links
 
 
 Thomas von Heesen at kicker.de 

1961 births
Living people
People from Höxter
Sportspeople from Detmold (region)
German footballers
Association football midfielders
Bundesliga players
2. Bundesliga players
Hamburger SV players
Arminia Bielefeld players
Germany under-21 international footballers
German football managers
German expatriate football managers
Bundesliga managers
Arminia Bielefeld managers
1. FC Nürnberg managers
Apollon Limassol FC managers
Kapfenberger SV managers
Lechia Gdańsk managers
Expatriate football managers in Austria
Expatriate football managers in Cyprus
2. Bundesliga managers
Footballers from North Rhine-Westphalia
Expatriate football managers in Poland
West German footballers
German expatriate sportspeople in Austria
German expatriate sportspeople in Iran
German expatriate sportspeople in Cyprus
German expatriate sportspeople in Poland